Itchen Valley Country Park is a country park in West End, Hampshire, England. The park has a number of walks and trails, including an off-road cycling track. There are a number of facilities for children, including a play area and a play trail. The Itchen Way footpath borders the park. The park was awarded the Green Flag award in 2009/10 and 2010/11.

History
The site is on the opposite bank of the river to Southampton Airport, the runway of which is reputedly built over the remains of a Roman villa.

The visitor centre was built in 1990. In 2010 work started on a Go Ape adventure course in the park, which opened in Spring 2011.

A free, weekly timed 5km parkrun is held at 9am every Saturday, having started on February 29, 2020.

Geography
The park contains a  water meadow nature reserve,  of ancient woodland (a third of which is classified as "semi-rural"),  of grazing land and a  recreation field.

Gallery

See also

References

Country parks in Hampshire
Borough of Eastleigh